Lyndon Yearick (born November 3, 1964) is an American politician who has served in the Delaware House of Representatives from the 34th district since 2015.

References

1964 births
Living people
21st-century American politicians
Republican Party members of the Delaware House of Representatives